John C. Buchanan arrived in San Francisco in 1846 by overland route from Kentucky. Buchanan was a member of Frémont’s Battalion, and was also owner of many town lots. In 1847 he was alcalde’s clerk under Bryant and Hyde, in 1848 a partner in the firm of McDonald & Buchanan, auctioneers and commission merchants. Buchanan Street, in San Francisco, is named after him.

American businesspeople
Year of birth missing
Year of death missing